Victor Kenneth Braden Jr. (August 2, 1929 – October 6, 2014) was an American tennis player, instructor and television broadcaster for the sport. He earned a PhD in psychology and was married twice.  He had 2 children, 1 grandchild and 3 step-children.

Biography

Introduced to tennis at age 12, he became good enough to earn three Michigan state high school championships, a scholarship to Kalamazoo College, invites to play in River Forest, Illinois and in Milwaukee. He told Sports Illustrated in a 1976 interview that he once hitchhiked to Detroit to watch Don Budge play Bobby Riggs, because he wanted to learn how Budge hit his backhand.

Braden graduated from Kalamazoo College, where he was Captain of the Tennis Team, and won the MIAA Conference Singles Title. He married a model, Joan, upon graduation.  He was awarded an honorary doctorate degree by his alma mater in 2008.

Vic Braden died of a heart attack on October 6, 2014 at the age of 85. He was married for many years to his 2nd wife, Melody.

Career
Braden became a tennis professional after graduating from Kalamazoo College in 1951.
While serving as Assistant Basketball Coach at the University of Toledo.  Harold Tenney hired him to become the Head Tennis Professional at the Toledo Tennis Club. Besides teaching, he joined the pro tour and played against Jimmy Evert (father of Chris Evert) and George Richey (father of Cliff and Nancy Richey).  He moved to California in 1956 and obtained a master's degree from  California State University, Los Angeles and an honorary PhD from Kalamazoo College. Braden joined Jack Kramer's pro tour in 1959.  In 1961, he and Kramer started the Jack Kramer Tennis Club in Palos Verdes, CA where Braden helped direct construction and sell memberships to the club and then served as the Head Tennis Professional. He started Tracy Austin in tennis, and developed his "Tennis College" concept. In 1986, Kramer said, "One Vic Braden is worth a lot of Champions in helping promote the sport. The McEnroes, Borgs, Connors, they've been great. But I don't think any one of them has created the interest in the sport that Vic has." Braden was a patient and good friend of Dr. Toby Freedman, who was prominent in Space and Sports Medicine at North American Aviation and Kerlan-Jobe Orthopedic Clinic,  and was an avid Tennis Player.

Professional accomplishments
Co-founder, Vic Braden Tennis College, Star Island Resort, Kissimmee, Florida
Co-founder, Vic Braden Tennis College, St. George, Utah
Founder-Director, Vic Braden Tennis College, Coto de Caza, California
1989-2002 Board Member: Vic Braden Sports Institute for Neurological Research, Washington, D.C.
1986-1994 Founder, Vic Braden Ski College, Aspen, Colorado
1980-1990 Co-founder, Co-director, Coto Sports Research Center, California
1967-1969 Manager, Pro Tennis Tour/George MacCall/Charlton Heston
1961-1972 Co-founder, Jack Kramer Club, Rolling Hills Estates, California
1957-1958 Instructor, University of California, Los Angeles (UCLA) Psychology Clinic
1952-1955 Head Tennis/Assistant Basketball Coach, University of Toledo, Ohio

Awards
Contributing Most to Tennis in America (USTA)
Orange County Hall of Fame Lifetime Achievement Award (Sportswriter)
Coach of the Year Award (USPTA).
ATP Children's Tennis Award.
 Faculty Emeritus Award
 USTA Midwest Tennis Hall of Fame
 International Tennis Hall of Fame Tennis Educational Merit Award (1974)
 International Tennis Hall of Fame inductee in 2017

Videos

Vic Braden's 70 Minutes with Big Jake Kramer and Pancho Gonzalez Video
Vic Braden's Biomechanics of Tennis Video
Vic Braden's Strategy Video
Vic Braden's The Backhand
Vic Braden's The Forehand
Vic Braden's The Serve
Tennis My Way

Vocational highlights
Licensed psychologist (California), author, sports educator and researcher, cinematographer, videographer, sports, television commentator.

Books authored
He has authored five books with Bill Bruns whom he met in 1973.
 
 
  Co-authored with L. Phillips.

Books: other
 Wrote foreword: High Tech Tennis (1992). By Jack L. Groppel.
 Co-editor, and credited as photographer: Championship Tennis by the Experts: How to Play Championship Tennis (1981).

Featured in print media
Time magazine

Vic's Vacant Lot
Braden hosted a short-lived television series, Vic's Vacant Lot, which ran from 1982 to early 1984 for 26 episodes on ESPN and rerun on Nickelodeon until May 1985. The premise was to send Braden out with a group of children to show them how to organize competitive sports on a vacant lot, as specified in the title. Due to the show not receiving much recognition, no recordings were available online, at least until January 3, 2022 when an Internet Archive user uploaded an episode of the show in two parts.

References

External links

Vic Braden at International Tennis Hall of Fame 
Vic Braden's Tennis Analysts Page
Braden's Facebook Page
Vic Braden Tennis College Profile
Vic Braden Quotes
TennisServer Profile

1929 births
2014 deaths
People from Monroe, Michigan
American male tennis players
American tennis coaches
Kalamazoo College alumni
International Tennis Hall of Fame inductees
Tennis commentators
Tennis people from Michigan
Professional tennis players before the Open Era